Gyrocheilus is a monotypic genus in the nymphalid subfamily Satyrinae. The single contained species is Gyrocheilus patrobas, the red-bordered brown, which is found in North America in central and southern Arizona and Mexico. The habitat consists of streamsides in open coniferous forests in the mountainous areas.

The wingspan is 51–60 mm. The wings are dark brown, with identical upper and lower sides. The forewing has a light brown submarginal band and three to four small white spots just inside the band. The hindwing has a wide, dull red border. There is one generation per year with adults on wing from mid-August to October.

The larvae feed on Muhlenbergia emersleyi.

Subspecies
Gyrocheilus patrobas patrobas (Mexico)
Gyrocheilus patrobas tritonia Edwards, 1874 (Arizona)

References

Satyrinae
Nymphalidae of South America
Monotypic butterfly genera
Taxa named by Arthur Gardiner Butler
Nymphalidae genera